Yeheni (爷贺尼; Pingdi Yao 平地瑶) is an unclassified Sinitic language spoken by the Yao people in Jianghua Yao Autonomous County, Hunan. It is spoken in Taoxu Town (涛圩镇) and Helukou Town (河路口镇) in Jianghua County, Hunan.

Vocabulary
The following word list of Yeheni is from Li (2011:325–326).

References

Varieties of Chinese
Sino-Tibetan languages
Yao people